Sydney-Membertou is a provincial electoral district in  Nova Scotia, Canada, that elects one member of the Nova Scotia House of Assembly.  It was created in 2012 as Sydney-Whtiney Pier from 79% of Cape Breton Nova and 59% of Cape Breton South.  Following the 2019 redistribution, the riding lost Whitney Pier to Cape Breton Centre-Whitney Pier, while gaining some territory from Sydney River-Mira-Louisbourg, and was re-named Sydney-Membertou.

The district contains the communities of Sydney, Grand Lake Road, Mira Road, Sydney River, Prime Brook and the Membertou 28B Indian Reserve.

The riding is represented by Derek Mombourquette of the Nova Scotia Liberal Party. He won the seat in a byelection on July 14, 2015, following the resignation of MLA Gordie Gosse.

Members of the Legislative Assembly
This riding has elected the following Members of the Legislative Assembly:

Election results

References

External links
 2013 riding profile

Nova Scotia provincial electoral districts
Politics of the Cape Breton Regional Municipality
2012 establishments in Nova Scotia